Yan Aung (born 14 December 1966) is a Burmese film actor. He has won 6 Myanmar Motion Picture Academy Awards throughout his career, including in 1991, 1995, 1996, 1998, 2000 and 2006, second only to Nyunt Win.

Yan Aung was born Hla Htun (လှထွန်း) in Rangoon, Burma (now Yangon, Myanmar) to parents Tin Maung and Thein Thein. He currently participates as a judge on Myanmar Idol.

Filmography

Film
A Maiden Like Me Thida (မယ်သီတာလို မိန်းကလေး) (1991)
A Better Moon in Bagan (ပုဂံမှာ သာတဲ့လ) (1995)
A Lighter Heaven (အလင်းဖျော့ကောင်းကင်) (1996)
Night Actor (ညမင်းသား) (1998)
Ignorant Horse Race (မောဟမျဉ်းပြိုင်) (2000)
Myet Nhar Myar Tae Kaung Kin (2004)
Glorious People (ဂုဏ်ရှိန်မြင့်တဲ့လူရယ်) (2006)
Myaw Lint Chin Myar Swar (2006)
Gon Shein Pyin Tae Chit Chin Thake Khar (2006)
Mommy Shane (မာမီရှိန်း) (2009)
Ko Tint Toh Super Yat Kwat (2014)
Shal Chway Ma (2018)

Album discography 
Yan Aung has recorded many albums throughout the 1990s, including both cover songs of international hits, as well as Myanmar tune songs. The following is a partial list.

Solo albums 

 Barani ဘရဏီ (1991)
 Lay Nu Aye လေနုအေး (1992)
 Gita Winkabar ဂီတဝင်္ကပါ (1993)
 Gita Winkabar 2 ဂီတဝင်္ကပါ ၂ (1994)
 Yin Khone Than ရင်ခုန်သံ (1996)
 Tan Khu Shwe Sin တန်ခူးရွှေစင် (1997)
 A Kyaw Kyar Sone Tay Myar အကျော်ကြားဆုံးတေးများ (2002)

With other artists 

 Dote Yae Kabar (+ May Sweet, Naw Li Zar, Rama) တို့ရဲ့ကမ္ဘာ (+ မေဆွိ ၊ နော်လီဇာ ၊ ရာမ) (1992)
 Myu Myu Kywa Kywa (+ Hay Mar Nay Win) မြူးမြူးကြွကြွ (+ ဟေမာနေဝင်း) (1995)
 Nway Moe Saung (+ May Sweet) နွေမိုးဆောင်း (+ မေဆွိ) (1996)
 1500 (+ Various Artists) ၁၅၀၀ (1999)
 Yan Aung Nae Thu Chit Thu Myar (Live Show) ရန်အောင် နှင့် သူ့ချစ်သူများ Live Show (2005)
 Yan Aung Nae Nat Tha Mee Myar (Live Show) ရန်အောင် နှင့် နတ်သမီးများ Live Show (2012)

TV show
He was involved as a Judge in Myanmar Idol season 3 (2018).

Awards and nominations

Political Activities

Following the coup d'etat on February 1, 2021, he participated in the Civil Disobedience Movement (CDM) and chanted slogans for the immediate release of the detained leaders, Aung San Suu Kyi and her government. However, on April 10, 2021, rumors spread on Facebook that the military junta issued a warrant and pressed three charges against him including most celebrities who participated in CDM back in February 2021. These charges are section 122 which is high treason, section 505(B) which is spreading rumors that spark fear or alarm of the state and section 33 which is an electronic law that was proposed in 2013. If he was arrested and found guilty of these charges, he will be executed, transported or serving more than 20 years in prison. This unconfirmed information sparked panic and confusion whether the information is fake or real. Their lives were in danger and some including Yan Aung, quit doing political activities and decided to participate in the events hosted by the junta to avoid the death penalty.

References

External links
 

Living people
1966 births
Burmese male film actors
People from Yangon
20th-century Burmese male actors
21st-century Burmese male actors
20th-century Burmese male singers